Internationale Club de Football Sportegyesület aka Inter CDF SE is a Hungarian football club, based in Budapest, Hungary. Founded in 2006 as Afrique Internationale Club de Football Sport Egyesulet by Africans and Hungarians in Budapest. In 2008, the club changed its name to Internationale Club de Football Sport Egyesület (Inter CDF SE). The colours were also changed from red and blue to white, blue and sky blue.
The club is a member of the official football league of the Hungarian Football Federation based in Budapest. 
Currently the club has one senior team in the top level of Hungarian amateur football league as well as academy.

History 
Internationale Club de Football Sportegyesulet (Inter CDF SE) was founded in the summer of 2006. It was officially registered as a Hungarian football club on 22 August 2006 by the Hungarian government, Budapest football federation and the Hungarian Football Federation as Afrique Internationale Club de Football Sport Egyesulet. It was nicknamed "Afrique Inter FC". In 2008, "Afrique" was officially removed from the club's name and renamed its current name in other to represent all interest.

Internationale club de football was founded with the aims and objectives of using the beautiful game of football to channel the energy of children and youths to more positive pursuits whilst preparing them for social integration and leadership roles, regardless of race, nationality or social status.

Non acceptance of then young football potentials of African origin by most Hungarian clubs and the Hungarian society was one of reasons of the formation of Inter CDF SE, in order to help the boys integrate into the Hungarian society and to keep their dream alive and not being laid astray by some in their community.

The formation of Inter CDF SE was part of the effort to create an enabling environment for the young talents here to integrate into the Hungarian society.

The first Inter CDF team paraded footballing talent from Nigeria, Ghana, Cameroon, Sudan, Ivory Coast, Liberia. The club also had of a number of talented Hungarians. The team was first coached and captained by Nelson Victor. Later, former Liberian international by name John Moses was contact to coach the team. Which made it to the final of the Budapest Kupa in 2007 which they lost 3-1 to TFSE. In 2008 Agonglo Geraldo Joel was contacted to coach the team. Inter CDF failed in their second attempt to win the Budapest cup in 2015, losing 1-4 to Pénzügyőr SE who were one division higher.

Foundation 

Internationale Club de Football Sport Egyesulet (Inter CDF SE) was founded in late summer of 2006 by Nelson Victor and friends. It was officially registered as a Hungarian football club on 22 August 2006 by the Hungarian government, Budapest football federation and the Hungarian football federation as Afrique Internationale Club de Football Sport Egyesulet. It was nicknamed "Afrique Inter FC". In 2008, "Afrique" was officially removed from the club's name.
Non acceptance of then young football potentials of African origin by most Hungarian clubs and the Hungarian society led to the formation of Inter CDF SE in order to help the boys integrate into the Hungarian society and to keep their dream alive and not being laid astray by some in their community. It paraded footballing talents from Nigeria, Ghana, Cameroon, Sudan, Ivory Coast, Liberia. The club also had of a number of talented young Hungarian players.  According to Mr. Nelson Victor, "Inter CDF SE was part of the effort of the organisers of the club to create an enabling environment for the young African talents here to integrate into the Hungarian society."

Stadium history

Orczy park 
2006-2008: Budapest, Orczy kert 1. With a standing capacity of 2000,  was the first home of Inter CDF SE. No visiting team escaped defeat in Orczy park. It still hold the record of Inter CDF SE match attendance and supporters. Unfortunately, after 2008 season the club had to relocate her home matches due to the poor playing pitch condition.

Tatai utca 
2008-2011: (1142 Budapest, Tatai út 3/b ). Capacity ; 500.

Siketek pálya 
Bp 1097, Könyves Kálmán kőrút 28, is the current home of Inter CDF SE since 2012 season. It is a small stadium with a sitting capacity of 168 and standing about 500.

League history

Club colours 
White, Blue and sky-blue are the club new colours since 2012, it replaces the former red and blue colours as reflected in the new logo which as well replaced the previous one.

Honours 
Winner
 2014.  Perbal kupa.
 2008/2009. Blsz II/1.
 2007/2008. Blsz III.
 2006/2007. Blsz IV. /2.
                  
Runners up
 2015 Budapest Kupa.
 2012/2013 Blsz II.
 2007 Budapest cup.

First team squad 
 

 2013 squad

References

External links 

Association football clubs established in 2006
Football clubs in Budapest
2006 establishments in Hungary